A margarita machine, also known as a frozen drink machine is a piece of commercial foodservice equipment which dispenses a frozen margarita. A margarita mix, traditionally lime flavored, is poured into the hopper, which can be refrigerated, and may contain a spinning agitator.  From the hopper, the product flows into the freezing cylinder, where it is frozen and kept at the proper viscosity to serve.  The user is able to dispense margaritas from such a device for extended periods of time without losing any quality in the taste of the margaritas. A margarita machine may be purchased from a foodservice distributor and is manufactured by companies such as Spaceman USA and Taylor Company.

History

The margarita machine was invented in 1971 by Mariano Martinez after receiving multiple customer complaints about the quality of the margaritas at his restaurant. He got the idea from seeing kids buy a Slurpee.

The frozen margarita machine was a pre-curser to frozen drink machines used for daiquiris, milk shakes, and other frozen beverages.

Characteristics
Margarita machines remove heat from a drink mix using a Vapor-compression refrigeration system (VCRS).  The product is fed into the freezing cylinder where it is agitated by an beater or auger, and frozen.  The freezing cylinder is also referred to as the evaporator.  One the product is frozen, it can be dispensed through the discharge door by manually pulling the handle.  Margarita machines can use any combination of ingredients, as long as the brix value is between 12-18.

A brix below 12 will lead to over freezing and a brix of over 18 will be hard to freeze and too sweet.

References

Bartending equipment